Jainism has an extensive history in the Indian state of Tamil Nadu, although practiced by a minority of Tamils in contemporary times. According to the 2011 India Census, Jains represent 0.12% of the total population of Tamil Nadu, and are of the Digambara sect. Tamil Jains are primarily concentrated in northern Tamil Nadu, in the districts of Madurai, Viluppuram, Kanchipuram, Vellore, Tiruvannamalai, Cuddalore and Thanjavur.

History

Early Tamil-Brahmi inscriptions in Tamil Nadu dated to the 3rd century BCE and describe the livelihoods of Tamil Jains. The oldest known Tamil kings were recorded to follow the Jain religion which makes Jainism, the second oldest religion in Tamil Nadu.
Inscriptions dating back to 8th century CE were found in Tiruchirappalli narrating the presence of Jain monks in the region.

The Kalabhra dynasty, who were patrons of Jainism, ruled over the entire ancient Tamil country in the 3rd–7th century CE.

Pallavas followed Hinduism but also patronized Jainism. The Trilokyanatha Temple in Kanchipuram and Chitharal Jain Temple were built during the reign of the Pallava dynasty.

The Pandyan kings were initially Jains but later became Shaivaites. Strabo states that an Indian king called Pandion sent Augustus "presents and gifts of honour". The Sittanavasal Cave and Samanar Malai are Jain complexes that were built during the reign of Pandyan dynasty.

The Cholas patronized Hinduism, however, Jainism also flourished during their rule. The Digambara Jain Temple in Thirakoil and the Mallinathaswamy Jain Temple in Mannargudi were both built during the reign of the Chola dynasty.

Decline of Jainism 
Royal patronage has been a key factor in the growth as well as the decline of Jainism. The Pallava king Mahendravarman I (600630 CE) converted from Jainism to Shaivism under the influence of Appar. His work Mattavilasa Prahasana ridicules certain Shaiva sects and the Buddhists and also expresses contempt towards Jain ascetics. Sambandar converted the contemporary Pandya king to Shaivism. During the 11th century, Basava, a minister to the Jain king Bijjala II, succeeded in converting numerous Jains to the Lingayat Shaivite sect. The Lingayats destroyed various temples belonging to Jains and adapted them to their use. The Hoysala king Vishnuvardhana (c.11081152 CE) became a follower of the Vaishnava sect under the influence of saint Ramanuja, after which Vaishnavism grew rapidly.

Art

Influence on Tamil literature 

Parts of the Sangam literature in Tamil are attributed to Jain authors. The authenticity and interpolations are controversial because the Sangam literature presents Hindu ideas. Some scholars state that the Jain portions of the Sangam literature were added about or after the 8th-century CE, and it is not the ancient layer.

Tamil Jain texts such as the Cīvaka Cintāmaṇi and Nālaṭiyār are credited to Digambara Jain authors. These texts have seen interpolations and revisions. For example, it is generally accepted now that the Jain nun Kanti inserted a 445 verse poem into Cīvaka Cintāmaṇi in the 12th-century. The Tamil Jain literature, states Dundas, has been "lovingly studied and commented upon for centuries by Hindus as well as Jains". The themes of two of the Tamil epics, including the Silapadikkaram, have an embedded influence of Jainism.

Silappatikaram, the earliest surviving epic in Tamil literature, was written by the monk Ilango Adigal. This epic is a major work in Tamil literature, describing the historical events of its time and also of then-prevailing religions, Jainism, Buddhism and Hinduism. The main characters of this work, Kannagi and Kovalan, who are renowned among Tamils, were Jains.

M. Karunanidhi, the former Chief Minister of Tamil Nadu and writer stated that "the virtuous Jains have adorned our 'Tamil mother' with innumerable jewels of literary works. If you remove these works of Samanars, the world of Tamil literature would wear a deserted look; such is the contribution of Jain poets to the Tamil language. The ancient kings have also encouraged and supported these noble efforts."

Jain structures 

There are 26 caves, 200 stone beds, 60 inscriptions, and over 100 sculptures in and around Madurai. This is also the site where Jain ascetics wrote great epics and books on grammar in Tamil.

The Sittanavasal Cave temple is regarded as one of the finest examples of Jain art. It is the oldest and most famous Jain centre in the region. It possesses both an early Jain cave shelter, and a medieval rock-cut temple with excellent fresco paintings comparable to Ajantha paintings; the steep hill contains an isolated but spacious cavern. Locally, this cavern is known as "Eladipattam", a name that is derived from the seven holes cut into the rock that serve as steps leading to the shelter. Within the cave there are seventeen stone beds aligned in rows; each of these has a raised portion that could have served as a pillow loft. The largest stone bed has a distinct Tamil-Brahmi inscription assignable to the 2nd century BCE, and some inscriptions belonging to the 8th century BCE are also found on the nearby beds. The Sittannavasal cavern continued to be the "Holy Sramana Abode" until the 7th and 8th centuries. Inscriptions over the remaining stone beds name mendicants such as Tol kunrattu Kadavulan, Tirunilan, Tiruppuranan, Tittaicharanan, Sri Purrnacandran, Thiruchatthan, Ilangowthaman, Sri Ulagathithan, and Nityakaran Pattakali as monks.

The Kazhugumalai temple from the 8th century CE marks the revival of Jainism in Tamil Nadu. This cave temple was built by King Parantaka Nedunjadaiya of Pandyan dynasty.

Mel Sithamur Jain Math is headed by the primary religious head of this community, Bhattaraka Laxmisena Swami.

Complexes
 Tirumalai
 Kalugumalai Jain Beds
 Thirakoil
 Samanar Hills
 Sittanavasal Cave
 Armamalai Cave
 Mangulam
 Vallimalai Jain caves
 Thirupparankundram Rock-cut Cave and Inscription
 Kurathimalai, Onampakkam
 Panchapandavar Malai
 Seeyamangalam
 Kanchiyur Jain cave and stone beds
 Andimalai Stone beds, Cholapandiyapuram
 Adukkankal, Nehanurpatti
 Ennayira Malai

Temples
 Mel Sithamur Jain Math
 Mannargudi Mallinatha Swamy Temple
 Arahanthgiri Jain Math
 Trilokyanatha Temple
 Vijayamangalam Jain temple
 Alagramam Jain Temple
 Karanthai Jain Temple
 Chitharal Malai Kovil
 Poondi Arugar Temple
 Adisvaraswamy Jain Temple, Thanjavur 
 Chandraprabha Jain Temple, Kumbakonam

See also

 Religion in Tamil Nadu
 Tamil Jain
 Kalugumalai Jain Beds
 Thirakoil
 Kanchiyur Jain cave and stone beds

References

Citation

Sources 
 
 
 
 
 
 
 
 
 
 

Jainism in India
Tamil Nadu